The 1930 United States Senate election in Nebraska took place on November 4, 1930. The incumbent Republican, George W. Norris, was re-elected to a fourth term. He defeated Gilbert Hitchcock, the former Senator for the Class 1 seat. The anti-Norris Republican Beatrice Fenton Craig ran by petition.

Democratic primary

Candidates
Gilbert Hitchcock, former U.S. Senator

Results

Republican primary

Candidates
George W. Norris, the incumbent Senator
W. M. Stebbins, Nebraska Treasurer

Results

Other candidates
Beatrice Fenton Craig had filed as a candidate for the Republican primary, however she stood aside in the hope that W. H. Stebbins would defeat Norris. When this failed, Craig accepted a petition by her friends to appear on the ballot. Craig did not see Norris as a true Republican, claiming he used the label "only when seeking his own election, or when it contributes to his own personal or fractional political power."

Results

References 

1930
Nebraska
United States Senate